Xylosma crenata, the sawtooth logwood, is a species of flowering plant in the family Salicaceae, that is endemic to the island of Kauai in Hawaii. It is threatened by habitat loss.

References

crenata
Plants described in 1976
Endemic flora of Hawaii
Trees of Hawaii
Critically endangered plants
Taxonomy articles created by Polbot
Taxobox binomials not recognized by IUCN